Cham Kaka (also Romanized as Cham Kākā) is a village in Hureh Rural District, Saman County, Chaharmahal and Bakhtiari Province, Iran. At the 2006 census, its population was 572, in 162 families. The village is populated by Turkic people.

References 

Populated places in Saman County